James Bond (January 4, 1900 – February 14, 1989) was an American ornithologist and expert on the birds of the Caribbean, having written the definitive book on the subject: Birds of the West Indies, first published in 1936. He served as a curator of the Academy of Natural Sciences of Philadelphia. His name was appropriated by writer Ian Fleming for his fictional British spy of the same name; the real Bond enjoyed knowing his name was being used this way, and references to him permeate the resulting media franchise.

Life and career
Bond was born on January 4, 1900, in Philadelphia, Pennsylvania, the son of Margaret Reeves ( Tyson) and Francis Edward Bond. His interest in natural history was spurred by an expedition his father undertook in 1911 to the Orinoco Delta. Bond was educated at the Delancey School followed by St. Paul's School in Concord, New Hampshire, but after the death of his mother he moved with his father to the United Kingdom in 1914. There, he studied at Harrow and later Trinity College, Cambridge, where he obtained a B.A. in 1922 and was the sole American member of the Pitt Club. 

After graduating he moved back to the United States and worked for a banking firm for three years in Philadelphia. An interest in natural history prompted him to quit, and along with Rodolphe Meyer de Schauensee, took out a loan to set out on an  expedition to the Amazon to collect specimens for the Academy of Natural Sciences. 

Subsequently, he worked as an ornithologist at the Academy of Natural Sciences in Philadelphia, rising to become curator of ornithology there. He was an expert in Caribbean birds and wrote the definitive book on the subject: Birds of the West Indies, first published in 1936. From the 1920s to the 1960s, he took dozens of birding explorations to the West Indies.

Bond won the Institute of Jamaica's Musgrave Medal in 1952; the Brewster Medal of the American Ornithologists' Union in 1954; and the Leidy Award of the Academy of Natural Sciences in 1975. He died in the Chestnut Hill Hospital in Philadelphia at age 89. He is interred in the church yard at Church of the Messiah in Gwynedd Valley, Pennsylvania. Bond's wife, the author Mary  Fanning  Wickham Bond née Porcher, who wrote several memoirs about her husband, died in 1997.

Fictional namesake

Ian Fleming, who was a keen bird watcher living in Jamaica, was familiar with Bond's book, and chose the name of its author for the hero of Casino Royale in 1953, apparently because he wanted a name that sounded "as ordinary as possible". Fleming wrote to the real Bond's wife, "It struck me that this brief, unromantic, Anglo-Saxon and yet very masculine name was just what I needed, and so a second James Bond was born." He did not contact the real James Bond about using his name in the books, and Bond did not learn of Fleming's character until the early 1960s, when Fleming's James Bond books became popular in the U.S. In 1964 during his annual winter stay at Goldeneye in Jamaica, James Bond and his wife visited Fleming unexpectedly. Also in his novel Dr. No Fleming referenced Bond's work by basing a large ornithological sanctuary on Dr. No's island in the Bahamas. In 1964, Fleming gave Bond a first edition copy of You Only Live Twice signed, "To the real James Bond, from the thief of his identity". In December 2008 the book was put up for auction, eventually fetching $84,000 (£56,000).

James Bond's wife told Fleming that her husband saw the use of his name for the character as a good joke, to which Fleming replied "I can only offer your James Bond unlimited use of the name Ian Fleming...Perhaps one day he will discover some particularly horrible species of bird which he would like to christen in an insulting fashion."

In 1966, James Bond's wife, Mary Fanning Wickham Bond, published a small book, "How 007 Got His Name".  It details her husband's life and discovery of the appropriation of his name along with their meeting Ian Fleming and the Hilary Brays at Goldeneye on February 5, 1964. By happenstance, the Canadian Broadcasting Corporation was filming an interview that day. 

In the 2002 Bond film Die Another Day, the fictional Bond, played by Pierce Brosnan, can be seen examining Birds of the West Indies in an early scene that takes place in Havana, Cuba. The author's name (James Bond) on the front cover is obscured. In the same film, when Bond first meets Jinx (Halle Berry), he introduces himself as an ornithologist. In the 2015 Bond film Spectre, the same book was seen in a promotional on-set photo, which is supposed to be appearing in an alternate take of a scene taking place in Bond's Chelsea apartment. However, it is nowhere to be found in the final film.

In the ITV Miss Marple murder mystery "A Caribbean Mystery", broadcast on 16 June 2013, Miss Marple meets Ian Fleming at a talk on "Birds of the West Indies", given by James Bond. Before the talk begins, Fleming tells Miss Marple that he's working on a new book, but trying to come up with a name for the character. When the speaker introduced himself, Fleming has a moment of inspiration and reaches for his notebook, as the first few bars of the film theme play. The talk by the ornithologist James Bond is on guano which figures in the background and plot of the James Bond spy novel Dr. No. This instance of James Bond was played by Charlie Higson, who wrote the Young Bond novels.

Works
One of Bond's early work in ornithology was through his maternal uncle Carroll Sargent Tyson Jr. (1878–1956). After the death of his mother, Bond spent time with his uncle, out in the outdoors in Mount Desert Island, Maine. In 1916, Tyson was prompted, inspired by Audubon's works, to produce large folios of the birds of Maine. Bond collected specimens of birds for his uncle to paint. This resulted in the production of 250 copies of the book The Birds of Mt. Desert Island (1941) with 20 chromolithographs. 

Bond's most enduring work was his guide to the Birds of the West Indies which was first published in 1936 and went into 11 editions during his lifetime. He published nearly 150 papers in various journals including descriptions of 63 new subspecies. His mother was a sister of the artist Carroll Sargent Tyson. 

James Bond noted that the distribution of hutias was limited by what he thought may have been a marine boundary. In 1973 David Lack proposed that this be called Bond's Line, a biogeographical boundary between Tobago and the Lesser Antilles that also divided birds of North and South American origin. In 2015 a new subspecies of hutia was described as Plagiodontia aedium bondi and named after Bond for his recognition of the biogeographical divide.

References

Sources

External links

American ornithologists
1900 births
1989 deaths
Scientists from Philadelphia
People educated at Harrow School
Alumni of Trinity College, Cambridge
Recipients of the Musgrave Medal
20th-century American zoologists